Litherland is a surname. Notable people with the surname include:

Albert Edward Litherland (born 1928), British nuclear physicist
Angus Litherland (born 1992), Australian rules footballer
Bob Litherland (1930–2011), British politician
Geoff Diego Litherland (born 1979), British painter
James Litherland (born 1949), British singer and guitarist
Jay Litherland (born 1995), American swimmer
Martin Litherland (born 1945), British geologist
Peter Litherland (1756–1805), British watchmaker and inventor